The Hong Kong Derby is a Hong Kong Thoroughbred horse race held annually since 1873. Restricted to horses four-years-old only since 1981, the race is run in mid-March and is the premier event on the domestic racing programme with a purse of HK$18 million (app. US$2.3 million). This race is the last race in the Hong Kong Four-Year-Old Classic Series.

The first Hong Kong Derby was raced at Happy Valley Racecourse but in 1979 was transferred permanently to its present location at Sha Tin Racecourse.

Since 1981, the Derby has been won by several horses who went on to earn Hong Kong Horse of the Year honors including Football, Co-Tack, Yuno When and River Verdon. In 2003, Elegant Fashion became the first filly to win the Derby since 1976.

From 2004 to 2012, the race was sponsored by Mercedes-Benz.  It is sponsored by BMW since 2013, and since then the Hong Kong actor and martial artist Donnie Yen has been appointed as the "BMW Hong Kong Derby Ambassador" for promoting the event and presenting the awards to the winning units.

Race distance

The racing distance of the Hong Kong Derby has varied over the years.  From 2000 to present, the distance has been 2000 metres, with the starting point in front of the Sha Tin grandstand. From 1977 to 1999, the race was held over 1800m.  From 1973 to 1976, the distance was 2230m.  From 1967 to 1972, the distance was "From The Two Mile Post Once Round & In" (1 mile 171 yards.) From 1963 to 1966, the distance was 1 1/4 mile.  In 1961 & 1962, the distance was "From the Half Mile Post Once Round & In" (1 mile 3 furlongs 65 yards.) From 1947 to 1960, the distance was One and a Half mile**.

Past winners

† designates a Triple Crown Winner of the Four-Year-Old Classic Series.

‡ designates a filly.

* designates a colt (non-gelding).

See also
 List of Hong Kong horse races

References

Racing Post:
 The Hong Kong Jockey Club official website of Mercedes-Benz Hong Kong Derby  (2011/12)
 Racing Information of Mercedes-Benz Hong Kong Derby (2011/12)
 The Hong Kong Jockey Club
 Hong Kong Derby.com

Recurring sporting events established in 1873
Horse races in Hong Kong
Open middle distance horse races
1873 establishments in Hong Kong